Montpelier is a village in St. Helena Parish, Louisiana, United States. The population was 286 at the 2010 census. It is part of the Baton Rouge Metropolitan Statistical Area.

Montpelier was the parish seat from 1812-1832.

Geography
Montpelier is located at  (30.679697, -90.654585).

According to the United States Census Bureau, the village has a total area of 1.9 square miles (4.8 km), of which 1.9 square miles (4.8 km) is land and 0.53% is water.

Demographics

As of the 2020 United States census, there were 196 people, 135 households, and 90 families residing in the village.

Education
Montpelier and all of St. Helena Parish are served by the St. Helena Parish School System. Zoned campuses include St. Helena Central Arts and Technology Academy (Grades 3-6), St. Helena Early Learning Center (Grades PK-2), and St. Helena College and Career Academy (Grades 7-12).

References

Villages in St. Helena Parish, Louisiana
Villages in Louisiana
Baton Rouge metropolitan area